Tidepool is a nonprofit company founded in 2013 which makes open-source tools to help people better manage diabetes. The company works together with Medtronic to create an interoperable automated insulin pump system.

References

External links

2013 establishments in California
Software companies based in the San Francisco Bay Area
Medical and health organizations based in California
Non-profit organizations based in the San Francisco Bay Area
Software companies of the United States